Jordi Ortega Alcalá (born 27 January 1995) is a Spanish footballer who plays for Recreativo de Huelva as a central midfielder.

Club career
Born in Mataró, Barcelona, Catalonia, Ortega joined FC Barcelona's youth setup in 2011, after representing CE Mataró, Fundaciò Sánchez Llibre and UE Vilassar de Mar. On 4 June 2014, after winning the 2013–14 UEFA Youth League, he signed for Wolverhampton Wanderers.

On 21 July 2015, Ortega joined Córdoba CF, being initially assigned to the reserves in Tercera División. He made his senior debut on 23 August, starting in a 2–0 away win against UB Lebrijana.

On 21 December 2016, Ortega renewed his contract until 2020. The following 10 June, he made his first team debut, coming on as a substitute for Federico Piovaccari in a 2–1 Segunda División home win against Girona FC.

On 26 July 2018, Ortega signed a two-year contract with Segunda División B side UD Melilla, after terminating his contract with the Blanquiverdes.

Honours

Club
Barcelona
 UEFA Youth League: 2013–14

References

External links

1995 births
Living people
People from Mataró
Sportspeople from the Province of Barcelona
Spanish footballers
Footballers from Catalonia
Association football midfielders
Segunda División players
Segunda División B players
Tercera División players
Córdoba CF B players
Córdoba CF players
UD Melilla footballers
CD Calahorra players
UE Vilassar de Mar players